was the pen-name of a Japanese writer. Her real name was Hirabayashi Tai.

Biography

Hirabayashi resolved at the age of 12 to become a writer and also developed an interest in socialism at a young age. After graduating from the Suwa Women’s Higher School in 1922, she moved to Tokyo and began living with an anarchist named Torazo Yamamoto. They went to Korea together but returned after only one month. They were both arrested in the confusion and clampdowns following the 1923 Great Kantō earthquake and released on condition of leaving Tokyo. She eventually moved to Manchuria and was to give birth in a hospital in Dalian but the child lived for only twenty-four days, dying of malnutrition. Based on this personal experience, she wrote the short story In the Charity Hospital, which established her as a writer of proletarian literature.

She married the novelist and critic  in 1927, but divorced him in 1955 after discovering that he had an illegitimate child. In 1946, she won the inaugural  with Kou iu onna.

After the war, she became a writer of "Tenko Bungaku" ("Conversion Literature", a controversial genre dealing with the renunciation of leftist beliefs) and showed conservative, anti-communist tendencies. Later, she was known to be a member of the Democratic Socialist Party.

Her writings were often modelled on her own life or contemporary authors but she also produced various social commentaries and essays. During the war, after receiving help from a gambler named Seiichi Ishiguro, she became interested in the world of the yakuza and also wrote novels with a chivalrous spirit such as Kokusatsu, Chitei no Uta and Nagurareru Aitsu. In 1967, she won the 7th Women's Literature Prize with Himitsu.

Legacy

There is a Hirabayashi Taiko Memorial Museum in Suwa City, Fukushima prefecture.

Literary works

 Azakeru (嘲る, 1927) - Self-Mockery
 Seryoushitsu ni te (施療室にて, 1928) - In the Charity Hospital
 Shussen ni te (1946) - Diary of the End of the War
 Hitori yuku (一人行く, 1946) - I Walk Alone
 Mou chugoku hei (1946) - Blind Chinese Soldiers
 Kishi mojin (1946) - The Goddess of Children or Demon Goddess
 Kau iu onna (かういふ女, 1946) - This Kind of Woman
 Watashi ha ikiru (私は生きる, 1947) - I Mean to Live
 Kokusatsu (黒札) - Black Notes
 Chitei no uta (地底の歌, 1948) - Song from the Underworld
 Jinsei jikken (1948) - A Life Experiment
 Hito no inochi (1950) - A Man's Life
 Nagurareru aitsu (殴られるあいつ) - The Beaten Man
 Onigo bojin (鬼子母神) -
 Sabaku no hana (砂漠の花, 1957) - Flowers in a Desert
 Sono hito to tsuma (その人と妻) - The Man and His Wife
 Erudorado Akarushi (エルドラド明るし)
 Fumou (1962) - Sterility
 Kuroi Nenrei (1963) - The Black Age
 Haha to iu onna (1966) - A Woman to Call Mother
 Himitsu (秘密, 1967) - Secret -- won the Women's Literature Prize in 1968.

See also
 Japanese literature
 List of Japanese authors

References

Further reading
 Kusakabe, Madoka. "Sata Ineko and Hirabayashi Taiko: The Café and Jokyû as a Stage for Social Criticism" (PhD thesis) (Archive). September 2011. Department of East Asian Languages and Literatures and the Graduate School of the University of Oregon.
 

1905 births
1972 deaths
Japanese socialists
People from Nagano Prefecture
20th-century Japanese women writers